You Hurt My Feelings is a 2011 American comedy-drama film written and directed by Steve Collins and starring John Merriman, Courtney Davis and Macon Blair.

Cast
John Merriman
Macon Blair
Courtney Davis
Lillian Collins
Violet Collins

Release
The film was featured at the 2011 LA Film Festival.  It was then released at the reRun Gastropub Theater in Dumbo, Brooklyn on May 4, 2012.

Reception
Eric Kohn of IndieWire graded the film an A−.  Glenn Heath Jr. of Slant Magazine awarded the film two and a half stars out of five.

References

External links
 
 

American comedy-drama films
2011 comedy-drama films
2011 films
2010s English-language films
2010s American films